The Bugatti W16 engine is a quad-turbocharged, W-16 engine, made by the Volkswagen Group, under their high-performance luxury sports car marque Bugatti, since 2005.

In 2021, Bugatti announced the retirement of the W-16 engine.

Overview

It is effectively two narrow-angle VR8 engines (based on the VR6 design) mated at an included angle of 90 degrees on a common crankshaft.

Applications
Bugatti Veyron
Bugatti 16C Galibier (concept car)
Bugatti Chiron
Bugatti Divo
Bugatti Centodieci
Bugatti Bolide
Bugatti Mistral
Bugatti Vision Gran Turismo (concept vehicle)

References

Volkswagen Group
Bugatti
Volkswagen Group engines
Gasoline engines by model
Engines by model